Sucúa Airport  is an airport serving the town of Sucúa in Morona-Santiago Province, Ecuador.

The runway parallels the main road entering Sucúa from the south.

See also

 List of airports in Ecuador
 Transport in Ecuador

References

External links
 OpenStreetMap - Sucúa
 OurAirports - Sucúa
 FallingRain - Sucúa Airport
 Google Maps - Sucúa
 

Airports in Ecuador